Pablo Leonel Gaitán (born 9 May 1992) is an Argentine professional footballer who plays as a midfielder for Gloria Buzău.

Career
Gaitán's career began with Primera División side Atlético de Rafaela. He was moved into the club's senior squad at the beginning of 2012, featuring in Copa Argentina matches with Banfield and Atlético Tucumán. He made his professional league debut in the following campaign of 2012–13, with interim manager Víctor Bottaniz selecting him for the full duration of a 3–0 defeat away to Newell's Old Boys on 3 December 2012. He remained with the club for three years, making eight appearances in all competitions. 2016 saw Gaitán join Unión de Sunchales. His first career goal arrived on 27 March against Sportivo Las Parejas.

After sixteen further goals for Unión de Sunchales across the 2016, 2016–17 and 2017–18 seasons, Gaitán departed in June 2018 to rejoin Atlético de Rafaela; a team now in Primera B Nacional. On 9 January 2019, Gaitán was loaned out to General Díaz in Paraguay for the 2019 season, where his older brother Cristián Gaitán also played at the time.

Personal life
Gaitán's brother, Cristián, is a fellow professional footballer.

Career statistics
.

References

External links

1992 births
Living people
People from San Lorenzo Department
Argentine footballers
Association football midfielders
Argentine expatriate footballers
Argentine Primera División players
Torneo Federal A players
Primera Nacional players
Paraguayan Primera División players
Atlético de Rafaela footballers
Unión de Sunchales footballers
General Díaz footballers
Liga I players
FC Politehnica Iași (2010) players
Liga II players
FC Gloria Buzău players
Expatriate footballers in Paraguay
Argentine expatriate sportspeople in Paraguay
Expatriate footballers in Romania
Argentine expatriate sportspeople in Romania
Sportspeople from Santa Fe Province